The Luhe is a roughly  left headstream of the River Naab in the Upper Palatine Forest in Bavaria, southern Germany.

It rises near the hamlet of Wampenhof near Waldthurn, flows through Waldthurn, Roggenstein, Kaimling, past Michldorf and Leuchtenberg and through Lückenrieth and Luhe-Markt. There it discharges into the Naab.

Due to the river's very steep descent, many watermills and hammer forges have been built along its course. Its catchment area is used almost entirely for agricultural purposes with the result that the water of the Luhe is of good quality, enabling many species of fish, crustaceans and mussels to thrive there.

Its most important tributaries are the Trausenbach, the Lerau and the Gleitsbach.

References

Rivers of Bavaria
Rivers of the Upper Palatine Forest
Rivers of Germany